Main article: FIBA Africa Championship 1999

South Africa 

Algeria 

Angola 

Cape Verde 

Côte d'Ivoire 

Egypt

Mali 

Morocco

Mozambique 

Nigeria 

Senegal 

Tunisia

References 

AfroBasket squads